Péricles Raimundo Oliveira Chamusca (born 29 September 1965), known as Péricles Chamusca, is a Brazilian football manager who is the current manager of Saudi club Al-Taawoun.

Early and personal life
Chamusca and his brother Marcelo Chamusca, who is also a coach, were born in Salvador, Bahia, Brazil.

Coaching career
Chamusca coached Japanese club Oita Trinita since September 2005, then brought the first J.League Cup title to the club in 2008. But on the very next season, the club suffered a 14th straight defeat in the league due to injuries of regular players. He was fired on July 14, and Ranko Popović took his position.

On July 31, 2009 he assigned with Sport Recife to coach the Pernambucano team. He replaced Emerson Leão. On November 7, 2009, the coach has quit Sport Club do Recife in agreement with the club chairman Sílvio Guimarães, the team placed the bottom in the Brasileirão championship standings.

On 29 June 2022, Chamusca was appointed as manager of Al-Taawoun.

Managerial statistics
As of 16 October 2022.

Honours
 Campeonato Baiano - 1995 (Vitória)
 Campeonato Alagoano - 1999 (CSA)
 Copa do Brasil - 2004 (Santo André)
 J. League Cup - 2008 (Oita Trinita)
 Campeonato Catarinense - 2010 (Avaí)
 Sheikh Jassim Cup - 2010 (Al-Arabi)
 King Cup - 2020–21 (Al-Faisaly)

Individual
 Saudi Professional League Manager of the Month: October 2021, November 2021

References

External links
Official website 
Official website 
Official website 

1965 births
Living people
Sportspeople from Salvador, Bahia
Brazilian football managers
Expatriate football managers in Japan
Expatriate football managers in Qatar
Campeonato Brasileiro Série A managers
Campeonato Brasileiro Série B managers
Campeonato Brasileiro Série C managers
J1 League managers
J2 League managers
Qatar Stars League managers
Esporte Clube Vitória managers
Santa Cruz Futebol Clube managers
Mirassol Futebol Clube managers
Rio Branco Esporte Clube managers
América Futebol Clube (RN) managers
Centro Sportivo Alagoano managers
Sport Club Corinthians Alagoano managers
Associação Desportiva Confiança managers
Brasiliense Futebol Clube managers
Sociedade Esportiva e Recreativa Caxias do Sul managers
Esporte Clube Santo André managers
Associação Desportiva São Caetano managers
Goiás Esporte Clube managers
Botafogo de Futebol e Regatas managers
Oita Trinita managers
Sport Club do Recife managers
Avaí FC managers
Al-Arabi SC (Qatar) managers
El Jaish SC managers
Associação Portuguesa de Desportos managers
Coritiba Foot Ball Club managers
Júbilo Iwata managers
Al-Gharafa SC managers
Al-Shaab CSC managers
Saudi Professional League managers
Al-Faisaly FC managers
Al Hilal SFC managers
Al Shabab FC (Riyadh) managers
Al-Taawoun FC managers